Podomachla arieticornis is a moth of the  family Erebidae. It is found in Cameroon.

References

Endemic fauna of Cameroon
Nyctemerina
Moths described in 1909